Nicolas Bibbs (born January 30, 1991) is an American soccer player who last played for Bethlehem Steel FC in the United Soccer League.

Career

College
Bibbs played one year of college soccer at Caldwell College in 2009, before transferring to Syracuse University in 2010.

While at college, Bibbs appeared for USL PDL clubs Reading United AC in 2010 and Ocean City Nor'easters in 2012.

Professional
After spending time in Sweden with third-tier side IFK Lammhult, Bibbs signed with USL club Saint Louis FC on February 25, 2015.

On January 28, 2016, Bibbs signed with USL club Bethlehem Steel FC. After 12 appearances and scoring once for Steel FC, Bibbs was released at the conclusion of the 2016 season.

References

External links
 Syracuse bio

1991 births
Living people
American soccer players
Syracuse Orange men's soccer players
Reading United A.C. players
Ocean City Nor'easters players
Saint Louis FC players
Association football defenders
Soccer players from Philadelphia
USL League Two players
USL Championship players
Philadelphia Union II players
American expatriate soccer players
Expatriate footballers in Sweden
American expatriate sportspeople in Sweden
Caldwell Cougars